ARA Pro Racing Sunshine Coast is an Australian UCI Continental cycling team established in 2018, gaining UCI Continental status the same year.

Team roster

Major wins
2018
 U23 National Criterium Championships, Cameron Scott
Stage 2 New Zealand Cycle Classic, Cameron Scott
Overall Tour de Tochigi, Michael Potter
Stages 1 & 2, Michael Potter
Young rider classification, Michael Potter
Stage 5 Tour of Qinghai Lake, Cameron Scott

2019
 National Road Race Championships, Michael Freiberg
Stage 2 Tour of Quanzhou Bay, Matthew Rice

2020
Stage 2 Tour de Langkawi, Taj Jones

National Champions
2018
 Australia U23 Criterium, Cameron Scott

2019
 Australia Road Race, Michael Freiberg

References

External links

UCI Continental Teams (Oceania)
Cycling teams established in 2018
Cycling teams based in Australia
2018 establishments in Australia
Sport in the Sunshine Coast, Queensland